Kairo cancer is a cutaneous condition that may develop due to hydrocarbon-fueled heat exposure from coal-fired clothing warmers.

See also 
 Kangri ulcer
 List of cutaneous conditions

References 

Skin conditions resulting from physical factors